"Get my way!" is the fourth single from J-pop singer Mami Kawada under Geneon Entertainment. The title track was used as the second outro theme for the anime series Hayate no Gotoku. The single reached #27 on the Oricon charts selling roughly 7,253 copies making this as Kawada's least successful single to date.

The single comes in a limited CD+DVD edition (GNCA-0069) and a regular CD only edition (GNCA-0070). The DVD contains the promotional video for Get my way!.

Track listing 

Get my way! - 2:56
Composition by: Kazuya Takase
Arrangement by: Kazuya Takase, Takeshi Ozaki
Lyrics: Mami Kawada
 - 4:21
Composition by: Tomoyuki Nakazawa
Arrangement by: Tomoyuki Nakazawa, Takeshi Ozaki
Lyrics: Mami Kawada
Get my way! (instrumental) - 2:56
 - 4:18

Charts and sales

References

2007 singles
2007 songs
Mami Kawada songs
Hayate the Combat Butler songs
Songs with lyrics by Mami Kawada
Song recordings produced by I've Sound